The  Dallas Examiner  is a newspaper that covers the African-American community in Dallas-Fort Worth.  Published weekly, it was founded in 1986 by Fred Finch, Jr., an influential attorney and civil rights leader, along with his wife, Mildred Finch, a math teacher described by the  New York Times  as "almost legendary in her dedication to her students and community." Financed entirely by the Finches, it was originally mailed to subscribers. It is the largest Black-owned broadsheet newspaper in Dallas-Forth Worth, and the first Black-owned newspaper to be published digitally.

Fred and Mildred Finch were murdered after four issues of The Dallas Examiner  were published. Their daughter, Mollie Finch Belt, assumed the role of publisher following the death of her parents. In 2002, it was named "Best Weekly Newspaper" by the Texas Publisher's Association.  It was also named "Best Weekly Newspaper" by the regional chapter of the National Association of Black Journalists.

References

Weekly newspapers published in Texas
Newspapers published in the Dallas–Fort Worth metroplex